Motohiro (written: , , , , , , ,  or ) is a masculine Japanese given name. Notable people with the name include:

, Japanese singer-songwriter
, Japanese sailor
, Japanese manga artist
, Japanese kugyō
, Japanese noble
, Japanese politician
, Japanese baseball player
, Japanese footballer and manager
, Japanese footballer

Japanese masculine given names